Bawarij were Sindhi pirates named for their distinctive barja warships (which means "large vessels of war" in Arabic) who were active between the period 251 AD to 865 AD. They  looted Arab shipping bound for the Indian subcontinent and China, but entirely converted to Islam during the rule of the Samma Dynasty (AD 1335–1520). They are mentioned by Ma'sudi as frequenting the pirate den at Socotra and other scholars describes them as pirates and sailors of Sindh. Their frequent piracy and the incident in which they looted two treasure ships coming from Ceylon became the casus belli for the Umayyad conquest of Sindh. 

Ibn Batuta describes their ships as having fifty rowers, and fifty men-at-arms and wooden roofs to protect against arrows and stones. Tabari describes them in an attack upon Basra in 866 CE as having one pilot (istiyam), three fire-throwers (naffatun), a baker, a carpenter and thirty-nine rowers and fighters making up a complement of forty-five. These ships were unsuited for warlike maneuvers and lacked the sleek prows or ramming capabilities of other contemporary naval units, but were intended to provide for hand-to-hand battles for crew upon boarding.

See also
 History of Sindh

Footnotes

References
 George F. Hourani, John Carswell, Arab Seafaring in the Indian Ocean in Ancient and Early Medieval Times, Princeton University Press, 1995, 
 Laurier Books Limited, Horatio John Suckling, Ceylon: A General Description of the Island, Historical, Physical, Statistical, Asian Educational Services, 1994, 

Ship types
Human-powered vehicles
Medieval ships
History of Sindh
Naval history of Pakistan
Sindhi people
Pirates
Pirates by nationality